Four Japanese destroyers have been named :

 , a destroyer escort (or frigate) of the Japanese Maritime Self-Defense Force in 1955
 , a  that entered into service of the Japanese Maritime Self-Defense Force in 2000

See also 
 Akebono (disambiguation)

Imperial Japanese Navy ship names
Japan Maritime Self-Defense Force ship names
Japanese Navy ship names